Jonathan Mitchell may refer to:

Sportspeople
 Jonathan Mitchell (footballer) (born 1994), English footballer
 Jonathan Mitchell, a linebacker for the 2011 Lehigh Valley Steelhawks season
 Jonathan Mitchell (basketball), 2006 winner of the Mr. New York Basketball award
 Jonathan Mitchell (cyclist), British cyclist, bronze medalist in 2015 and 2017 British National Track Championships competitions

Others
 Jonathan Mitchell (writer) (born 1955), American autism writer and activist
 Jonathan Mitchell (producer) in Who Do You Love? (2008 film)
 Jonathan F. Mitchell, American attorney, academic, and government official

See also
 Jon Mitchell (disambiguation)
 John Mitchell (disambiguation)
 Joni Mitchell, Canadian singer-songwriter